× Vandaenopsis, abbreviated Vdnps. in the horticultural trade, is an intergeneric hybrid between the orchid genera Phalaenopsis and Vanda (Phal. × V.). It is now the accepted name for several former hybrid genera, since Ascocentrum and Neofinetia are now both synonymous with Vanda.

References

Orchid nothogenera
Aeridinae